Hero of Labour of the Russian Federation is a state award of Russia. The title is awarded to citizens of Russia for special services in labour to the state and its people associated with the achievement of outstanding results in public, social and economic activities aimed at ensuring the welfare and prosperity of Russia.

The award was established by Russian President Vladimir Putin by Presidential Decree №294 of March 29, 2013, "On establishing the Hero of Labour of the Russian Federation". This award is seen as the successor of Soviet Union's Hero of Socialist Labour.

Heroes of Labour of the Russian Federation

Politicians 
Mintimer Shaimiev, Sergey Lavrov

Artists 
Valery Gergiev, Joseph Kobzon, Nikita Mikhalkov, Galina Volchek, Mark Zakharov, Yury Solomin, Eduard Artemyev

Scientists 
Herbert Yefremov, Evgeny Velikhov, Georgy Rykovanov

Others 
Irina Viner-Usmanova, Vladimir Bogdanov, Arkady Rotenberg, Leonid Roshal, Alexey Miller, Alisa Aksyonova

References

See also
Honorary titles of Russia

Honorary titles of Russia
Civil awards and decorations of Russia
Awards established in 2013
Business and industry awards
2013 establishments in Russia
Hero (title)